Government Girls Post Graduate College, Etawah, formerly Panchayat Raj Government Girls College, is a government women's college offering BA, BCom and MA courses located in Etawah, Uttar Pradesh. It was established as Panchayat Raj Government Girls College in 1991. It is affiliated to Chhatrapati Shahu Ji Maharaj University of Kanpur.

References

Universities and colleges in Etawah district
Colleges affiliated to Chhatrapati Shahu Ji Maharaj University
Education in Etawah
Women's universities and colleges in Uttar Pradesh
Postgraduate colleges in Uttar Pradesh